Noel W. Campbell (born December 1941) is a Republican member of the Arizona House of Representatives representing Arizona's Legislative District One, alongside Steve Pierce.

Political experience
Campbell was elected in 2014, and this is his first elected position. He succeeded Speaker of the House Andy Tobin. He previously served in the Navy, retiring from the Naval Reserve with the rank of Commander. He has also served in the U.S. Customs Service, the U.S. Forest Service, and is a small business owner.

Elections
In 2014, Campbell successfully ran alongside Karen Fann. Campbell came in second behind Fann and ahead of Democratic challenger Frank Cucciain the general election with 43,864 votes.

Accusations of Domestic Violence
In December 2020, Campbell’s wife accused him of domestic violence according to a police report taken by the City of Prescott Police Department. According to Campbell’s wife, the former state representative pushed her multiple times until she fell over and then “struck her multiple times in the neck and multiple times in the face.” Campbell’s wife did not press charges as she believed Campbell’s violence was a result of early stages of dementia and that they would be seeking medical treatment.

References

External links
 

Republican Party members of the Arizona House of Representatives
Living people
United States Customs Service personnel
21st-century American politicians
1941 births